Harbin Guoli Football Club is a defunct football club who played in Harbin, Heilongjiang and their home stadium was the 50,100 seater Jiaodaruisun Stadium. Founded on February 28, 1996 as Shaanxi National Power F.C. in Xi’an, Shaanxi, they played nine seasons in the Chinese football leagues system with three of them in the top tier where they achieved their best finish of ninth place in 2001 Chinese Jia-A League season. They were forced to withdraw from the 2005 China League One before the start of the season by the Chinese Football Association due to accumulated debts.

Name history
 1996–2004 Shaanxi National Power 陕西国力
 2004 Ningbo National Power 宁波国力
 2005 Harbin Guoli 哈尔滨国力

Honours
Chinese Jia B League (Second Tier League)
 2000

Results
All-time League rankings
As of the end of 2005 season

:  in group stage
:  no relegation

References

External links
Shaanxi Guoli history at china.com.cn (Chinese)

Football clubs in China
History of Shaanxi
Defunct football clubs in China
Association football clubs established in 1996
Association football clubs disestablished in 2005
1996 establishments in China
2005 disestablishments in China
Companies that have filed for bankruptcy in the People's Republic of China